Idaho Legislative District 29 is one of 35 districts of the Idaho Legislature. It is currently represented by Senator Eva Nye, Democrat  of Pocatello, Representative Dustin Manwaring, Republican of Pocatello, and Elaine Smith, Democrat of Pocatello.

District profile (2012–present) 
District 29 currently consists of a portion of Bannock County.

District profile (2002–2012) 
From 2002 to 2012, District 29 consisted of a portion of Bannock County.

District profile (1992–2002) 
From 1992 to 2002, District 29 consisted of a portion of Bonneville County.

See also

 List of Idaho Senators
 List of Idaho State Representatives

References

External links
Idaho Legislative District Map (with members)
Idaho Legislature (official site)

29
Bannock County, Idaho